Camilla Holth (born 25 December 1978) is a Norwegian curler. She won a silver medal at the 2004 World Curling Championships.

References

External links
 

1978 births
Living people
Norwegian female curlers
Olympic curlers of Norway
Curlers at the 2002 Winter Olympics
Curlers at the 2006 Winter Olympics
Continental Cup of Curling participants